Ehrenstein is a German surname. Notable people with the surname include:

Albert Ehrenstein (1886-1950), Hungarian-Austrian writer
David Ehrenstein (born 1947), American critic

Ehrenstein may also refer to:

Schloß Ehrenstein (Ehrenstein Castle), a castle in Ohrdruf, Thuringia, Germany.

See also
Ehrenstein illusion

German toponymic surnames
German-language surnames
Jewish surnames